Luigi Grossi (10 May 1925 – 14 August 2008) was an Italian sprinter. He competed in the men's 200 metres at the 1952 Summer Olympics.

References

External links
 

1925 births
2008 deaths
Athletes (track and field) at the 1952 Summer Olympics
Italian male sprinters
Olympic athletes of Italy
Mediterranean Games silver medalists for Italy
Mediterranean Games medalists in athletics
Athletes from Milan
Athletes (track and field) at the 1955 Mediterranean Games
20th-century Italian people